Kaia Kanepi was the defending champion but chose to compete in 2011 Mutua Madrileña Madrid Open instead. 
Sorana Cîrstea defeated Pauline Parmentier in the final 6–7(5–7), 6–2, 6–2.

Seeds

Draw

Finals

Top half

Bottom half

References
Main Draw
Qualifying Singles

Open GDF Suez de Cagnes-sur-Mer Alpes-Maritimes - Singles